This is a list of all cricketers who have captained Afghanistan in an official international match. This includes the ICC Trophy, Under-19 games and One Day International.

Men's cricket

Test captains
This is a list of cricketers who have captained the Afghanistan cricket team for at least one Test match.

A cricketer who has a symbol of next to a Test match series describes their role as captain and their participation in at least one game for the team.

One Day International captains

Afghanistan played their first ODI on April 19, 2009.The table of results is complete up to the third ODI against Ireland in January 2021.

Twenty20 International captains

Afghanistan played their first T20I on February 1, 2010.The table of results is complete up to the ICC T-20 world cup match against New Zealand in October 2021.

ICC Cricket World Cup Qualifier (ICC Trophy)

Afghanistan debuted in the ICC Cricket World Cup Qualifier in the 2009 tournament

References

External links

Afghanistan in international cricket
Afghanistan
Captains
Afghanistan